Ali al-Jarrah (Arabic: علي الجراح, ʿAlī al-Jarrāh; born 1958) is a Lebanese man who was accused of spying for Israel for 25 years.

Spying
According to The New York Times, following Israel's 1982 invasion of Lebanon, Jarrah was jailed and then recruited as an intelligence asset by Israeli officers in 1983.  As part of his work he photographed Hezbollah supply routes, and traveled throughout Lebanon and Syria. He communicated his information by satellite phone, and even made several trips to Israel on an Israeli passport obtained in Belgium or Italy.  Paid by means of dead drops, Jarrah is reported to have received in excess of US$300,000 over the years.

Personal life
Ali al-Jarrah lived in Maraj, Lebanon with his wife Maryam Shmouri al-Jarrah and their five children. A brother, Yusuf, has also been accused of helping him spy for Israel. Jarrah is also said to have secretly married a second wife living in Masnaa, which made it easier for him to move between the Lebanon-Syria border.

Ali al-Jarrah is a first cousin of Ziad Jarrah, who is known as one of the terrorists that hijacked United Airlines Flight 93 as part of the September 11 attacks.

References 

1958 births
People from Western Beqaa District
Israeli spies
Living people